Tipolo may refer to the following places in the Philippines:

 Tipolo, Mandaue, a barangay in the city of Mandaue
 Tipolo, a barangay in the municipality of Dueñas, Iloilo
 Tipolo, a barangay in the municipality of Mina, Iloilo
 Tipolo, a barangay in the municipality of Ubay, Bohol
 Tipolo, a barangay in the municipality of Kapatagan, Lanao del Norte
 Tipolo, a barangay in the municipality of Plaridel, Misamis Occidental